Nationality words link to articles with information on the nation's poetry or literature (for instance, Irish or France).

Events
 Guru Gobind Singh becomes guru at the age of nine years

Works published

English
 Charles Cotton:
 Burlesque upon Burlesque; or, The Scoffer Scoft, published anonymously
 The Scoffer Scoft, the second part of the above Burlesque [...]
 Thomas Hobbes, translator, The Odyssey of Homer (the author's translation of the Iliad was published in 1676)
 Richard Leigh, Poems, upon Several Occasions, and, to Several Persons
 Edward Phillips, editorTheatrum Poetarum; or, A Compleat Collection of the Poets of all Ages

Other
 René Le Bossu, Traité du Poeme Epique, a systematic description of epic poetry, based on Aristotle; the book was very favorably received; criticism, France

Births
Death years link to the corresponding "[year] in poetry" article:
 February – Ignjat Đurđević (died 1737), Croatian poet and translator
 February 26 (bapt.) – Abel Evans (died 1737), English clergyman, academic and poet
 August 31 – Elizabeth Thomas (died 1731), English poet
 September 2 – William Somervile (died 1742), English poet
 October 17 (bapt.) – Samuel Cobb (died 1716), English poet
Also:
 Cille Gad (died 1711), Norwegian female poet and academic
 Jamie Macpherson (died 1700), Scottish outlaw, famed for his lament
 Vakhtang VI of Kartli (died 1737), Kartli statesman, legislator, scholar, critic, translator and poet

Deaths
Birth years link to the corresponding "[year] in poetry" article:
 April 24 – Pierre Perrin (born 1620), French poet and libretto composer
 September 12 – Girolamo Graziani (born 1604), Italian poet
 November 14 – Johannes Khuen (born 1606), Bavarian German priest, poet and composer
 Also – Emanuele Tesauro (born 1592), Italian rhetorician, dramatist, Marinist poet and historian
 Approximate date – William Mercer (born 1605), Scottish poet and army officer

See also

 Poetry
 17th century in poetry
 17th century in literature
 Restoration literature

Notes

17th-century poetry
Poetry